Juan de Jesús Garrigó Mejía (born 27 December 1994) is a Dominican Republic politician and economist.

Early life and family
Garrigó Mejía was born on 27 December 1994 into a prominent upper class white family from Santiago, Dominican Republic with political connections. His parents are Carolina Mejía, mayor of Santo Domingo, and Juan Antonio Garrigó Lefeld, insurance and brokerage businessman. The eldest of his siblings, he has 1 brother and 1 sister. His maternal grandfather Hipólito Mejía was President of the Dominican Republic from 2000 to 2004.

Garrigó Mejía studied political sciences and economics at the American University in Washington, D.C. He has a postgraduate degree from Barna Management School and Georgetown University.

Political career

On 16 August 2020 President Luis Abinader designated Garrigó Mejía as Administrative Vice Minister of the Presidency.

References

External links

1994 births
Dominican Republic people of Canarian descent
Dominican Republic people of Catalan descent
Dominican Republic people of German descent
Dominican Republic Roman Catholics
Living people
Modern Revolutionary Party politicians
People from Santiago de los Caballeros
Political office-holders in the Dominican Republic
White Dominicans